The Men's 50 metre rifle three positions competition at the 2015 European Games in Baku, Azerbaijan was held on 21 June at the Baku Shooting Centre.

Schedule
All times are local (UTC+5).

Records

Results

Qualification

Final

References

External links

Men's 50 metre rifle three positions